Portland Armory may refer to:

Portland Regency Hotel & Spa, Portland, Maine
The Armory (Portland, Oregon)